The first season of the American sitcom The Big Bang Theory aired on CBS from September 24, 2007 to May 19, 2008. The Season 1 DVD came without a gag reel and is, so far, the only Big Bang Theory DVD set not to have one. The reissued Blu-ray, which was released on July 10, 2012, includes a gag reel that is exclusive to the set. The episodes on Blu-ray are all in remastered surround sound, whereas the DVD version had stereo. Two of the main characters, Sheldon and Leonard, are named after actor, director, and producer Sheldon Leonard.

Johnny Galecki and Sara Gilbert both selected the episode "The Hamburger Postulate" as a Primetime Emmy Award submission for Outstanding Lead Actor in a Comedy Series and Outstanding Guest Actress in a Comedy Series, respectively, at the 60th Primetime Emmy Awards, but both ended up not receiving a nomination. Jim Parsons selected the episode "The Pancake Batter Anomaly" as a Primetime Emmy Award submission for Outstanding Lead Actor in a Comedy Series at the 60th Primetime Emmy Awards, but he ended up not receiving a nomination.

Cast

Main cast
 Johnny Galecki as Dr. Leonard Hofstadter
 Jim Parsons as Dr. Sheldon Cooper
 Kaley Cuoco as Penny
 Simon Helberg as Howard Wolowitz
 Kunal Nayyar as Dr. Rajesh "Raj" Koothrappali

Recurring cast
 Brian Patrick Wade as Kurt
 Vernee Watson as Althea
 Sara Gilbert as Leslie Winkle
 Laurie Metcalf as Mary Cooper
 Mark Harelik as Dr. Eric Gablehauser
 Carol Ann Susi as Mrs. Wolowitz
 Brian George as Dr. V.M. Koothrappali
 Alice Amter as Mrs. Koothrappali

Guest cast
 Brooke D'Orsay as Christy
 James Hong as Chen
 Sarayu Rao as Lalita Gupta
 DJ Qualls as Toby Loobenfeld
 Austin Lee as Dennis Kim
 Andrew Walker as Mike
 Courtney Henggeler as Missy Cooper

Production 

The series' initial pilot, which was developed for the 2006–07 television season, was substantially different from its current form. From the later series, only Johnny Galecki and Jim Parsons were in the cast, and their across-the-hall neighbor Katie was envisioned as "a street-hardened, tough-as-nails woman with a vulnerable interior". Katie was played by actress Amanda Walsh. They also had a female friend called Gilda, who was played by Iris Bahr. The series' original theme music was also different, using Thomas Dolby's hit "She Blinded Me with Science". The series was not picked up, but the creators were given an opportunity to revise it, bringing in the remaining leading cast and retooling the show to its current format. The original unaired pilot has never been released on any official format, but copies of it have circulated online.

The second pilot of The Big Bang Theory was directed by James Burrows, who did not continue with the show. This reworked pilot led to a 13-episode order by CBS on May 14, 2007. Prior to its airing on CBS, the pilot episode was distributed free of charge on iTunes. The series premiered on September 24, 2007, and was picked up for a full 22-episode season on October 19, 2007.

Production on the series was halted on November 6, 2007 due to the 2007–08 Writers Guild of America strike. The Big Bang Theory was replaced by a short-lived sitcom, Welcome to The Captain on February 4, 2008. The series ended up returning on March 17, 2008 in an earlier time slot.

David Saltzberg, a professor of physics and astronomy at the University of California, Los Angeles, checks scripts and provides dialogue, math equations and diagrams used as props.

Clips from the first season finale, "The Tangerine Factor", gained popularity on the Chinese video-sharing website Tudou because of Sheldon's comically inaccurate Mandarin.

Episodes

Reception 
The Big Bang Theory initially received mixed reviews, receiving a 59% "rotten" score on review aggregator site Rotten Tomatoes, based on 29 reviews, with the critics consensus reading "The Big Bang Theory brings a new class of character to mainstream television, but much of the comedy feels formulaic and stiff." It also received a 57-point score on review aggregator Metacritic, indicating "mixed or average reviews", based on 23 reviews.

Tom Shales of The Washington Post gave the show a positive review, saying "Big Bang is the funniest new sitcom of the season". Robert Bianco of USA Today also gave the show a positive review, saying "This may not be the sitcom breakthrough for which we've all been hoping, but Lorre has produced a first episode that leaves you eager to try the second".

David Bianculli of New York Daily News criticized the dialogue, particularly when the male characters explain jokes, writing that "People tuning in to Big Bang may not all be Mensa members, but they won't all be idiots, either", Henry Goldblatt of Entertainment Weekly criticized the premise and plot of early episodes, writing that "To call this a one-joke sitcom would be a stretch", and Tim Goodman of San Francisco Chronicle criticized the stereotypes presented in the characters, and wrote that "the writing here is so moronic and the situations so forced and mundane".

References 

General references

External links

2007 American television seasons
2008 American television seasons
The Big Bang Theory seasons